La Música No Se Toca (English: The music is not played) is the tenth studio album recorded by Spanish singer-songwriter Alejandro Sanz. It was produced by himself alongside Colombian Grammy award winner Julio C. Reyes. It was released by Universal Music Latino and Universal Music Spain on September 25, 2012. This album is the follow-up to the Grammy Award-winning album Paraíso Express (2009). It was nominated for Pop Album of the Year at the Premio Lo Nuestro 2013.

Singles
 "No Me Compares" was released as the album's lead single on June 25, 2012. The song became a good hit on worldwide charts, becoming Sanz's first-ever number-one single with Universal Music Group. It stayed at number one for twelve consecutive weeks. A Brazilian-Portuguese version, named "Não Me Compares", was released only in Brazil on December 1, 2012, featured the Brazilian singer Ivete Sangalo. The music video was released on December 18.
 "Se Vende" was released as the album's second single on September 17, 2012.
 "Mi Marciana" was released as the album's third single on November 12, 2012. On December 21, he released a lyric video for the song.
 "Irrepetível", featured Brazilian singer Ana Carolina, was released as fourth single on January 30, 2013, only in Brazil.

Other songs
"La Música No Se Toca", first track of the album, entered the Spanish chart at number 42.

Track listing

Charts

Weekly charts

Year-end charts

Sales and certifications

Production credits 
 Producido por: Julio Reyes Copello y Alejandro Sanz
 Ingenieros de Grabacion: Edgar Barrera, Julio Reyes Copello, Lee Levin, Alejandro Sanz, Javier Garza, Javier Limon, Rafa Sardina, Juan Pablo Vega, Alonso Arreola, Samuel Torres, Dan Warner, Kamilo Krate, Sebastian de Peyrecave.
 Mezclado por: Sebastian Krys y Rafa Sardina.
 Arreglos y Programacion: Julio Reyes Copello, Marcos Sanchez, Javier Limon, Juan Pablo Vega, Samuel Torres.
 Programacion Adicional: Sebastian de Peyrecave
 Arreglos de Metales: Samuel Torres, Julio Reyes Copello
 Masterizado por: Antonio Baglio

References

2012 albums
Alejandro Sanz albums
Universal Music Latino albums
Universal Music Spain albums
Spanish-language albums
Latin Grammy Award for Best Contemporary Pop Vocal Album
Albums produced by Julio Reyes Copello